Sedat Yüce (born 1976) is a Turkish singer. He represented Turkey in the Eurovision Song Contest 2001. He also attempted to participate in O Ses Türkiye, the Turkish version of The Voice, which garnered a negative response.

Eurovision
He started his Eurovision career as a backing singer for the Turkish national final in 1993. He officially took part as a solo singer on 4 occasions: first in 1996, he took part in the Turkish national final with the song Vazgeç, and finished 3rd; In 1999, this year with the song Bırak Beni, and finished 4th; and in 2001, this year with the song Sevgiliye Son, and won. He later took part in 2005, this year with the song Yeniden, but fell into a tied last place with zero points.

Eurovision 2001

Sedat won the Turkish national final for that year, and participated in the Eurovision Song Contest 2001 in Copenhagen. He came in 11th place with 45 points.

References

1976 births
Living people
Musicians from İzmir
Eurovision Song Contest entrants of 2001
Eurovision Song Contest entrants for Turkey
Turkish pop singers
21st-century Turkish singers
21st-century Turkish male singers